On February 10, 1993, the Cabinet of Nikola Šainović was sworn in before the National Assembly. This minority government was supported by the Serbian Radical Party, even though all the Cabinet members were from Socialist Party of Serbia. Due to hyperinflation, the President of Serbia disbanded this Cabinet, and called for new Parliamentary Election.

Cabinet members

See also
Cabinet of Dragutin Zelenović
Cabinet of Radoman Božović
List of prime ministers of Serbia
Cabinet of Serbia

References

Cabinets of Serbia
Cabinets established in 1993
Cabinets disestablished in 1994